Melanocercops cyclopa is a moth of the family Gracillariidae. It is known from West Bengal, India.

References

Acrocercopinae
Moths of Asia
Moths described in 1908